Mandya is a city in the state of Karnataka.

Sugar factories contribute to the major economic output. It is also called Sugar city (which in Kannada means Sakkare nagara) because sugarcane is a major crop. Mandya city has district offices premises. Currently the city is having 35 municipal wards of Mandya city municipal corporation.

History
There is a brief history of 75 years to Mandya. Mandya celebrated it 75th year (Amrutha Mahothsava) in 2015. The magnificent KRS dam was built by Krishna Raja Wadiyar IV and M. Visvesvaraya in Mandya. There are a lot of historical places of importance in Mandya. In 2016, Archaeological Survey of India (ASI) excavated another  statue of Bahubali, a much revered figure among Jains. He was the son of Adinath, the first tirthankara of Jainism, and the younger brother of Bharata Chakravartin, identified with the 3rd – 9th centuries in Arthipura, Mandya district. The excavation is expected to be completed by 2018.

Transport
The Mandya railway station is located in the city centre,  well connected to Mysuru and Bengaluru, and also daily train service to Chennai, Hyderabad, Kochuveli, Mangaluru, Belagavi, Bagalkot, Hubli, Ballari and also weekly trains to Varanasi, Darbhanga, Jaipur, Ajmer. The city has the KSRTC bus stand and has the frequent buses to Bangalore and Mysore. The NH 275 passes over the city.

Geography

Demographics
 India census, Mandya had a population of 131,211. Males constitute 51% of the population and females 49%. Mandya has an average literacy rate of 73%, higher than the national average of 59.5%: male literacy is 77%, and female literacy is 68%. In Mandya, 11% of the population is under 6 years of age.

Climate

Gallery

See also
Tourist Attractions in Mandya

References

External links

 Homepage of Mandya

Cities and towns in Mandya district
Cities in Karnataka